Edward Franklin Camp Jr. (December 23, 1905 – January 26, 1986) was an American football player and coach. He served as the head football coach at the University of Louisville from 1946 to 1968, compiling a record of 118–95–2 (.551). He is credited as the man who brought back Louisville football following a three-year absence caused by World War II, and has the most wins of any head coach in school history. Pro Football Hall of Fame quarterback Johnny Unitas was among the players Camp coached. In 1947, Louisville had a 7–0–1 season.

Camp was born on December 23, 1905 on Trenton, Kentucky. He graduated from Transylvania University, where he played football as a quarterback, in 1930. He starting his coaching career at the high school level, working in Hodgenville, Glasgow, and Henderson, Kentucky.

Head coaching record

College

References

External links
 

1905 births
1986 deaths
American football quarterbacks
Louisville Cardinals football coaches
Transylvania Pioneers football players
High school football coaches in Kentucky
People from Todd County, Kentucky
Coaches of American football from Kentucky
Players of American football from Kentucky